, Aegean Airlines flies to 91 destinations, excluding charter flights and flights it operates for its subsidiary, Olympic Air.

List

References

Lists of airline destinations
Star Alliance destinations